Drabescini is a tribe of leafhoppers in the subfamily Deltocephalinae. There are currently 38 genera and almost 200 species in Drabescini divided into two subtribes: Drabescina and Paraboloponina.

Genera 
There are currently 38 described genera divided into two subtribes:

Subtribe Drabescina 

 Drabescus 
 Rengatella 

Subtribe Paraboloponina

References 

Deltocephalinae